Apolo may refer to:

 Apolo, La Paz, a town in the La Paz Department in Bolivia 
 Apolo Anton Ohno, a US-American Olympic gold medal-winning short track speed skater who also won Dancing with the Stars in 2007
 Apolo Kivebulaya, Ugandan Anglican priest and evangelist
 Germán Figueroa, also known as Apolo—a Puerto Rican professional wrestler

See also
 Apollo (disambiguation)
 Appolo (disambiguation)
 Appollo (disambiguation)